Jacob Castro may refer to:

 Yaakov de Castro (1525–1610), rabbinic scholar and judge
 Jacob Castro (soccer) (born 1999), American soccer player